Mark Newman is an English-American physicist.

Mark Newman may also refer to:

Mark Newman (baseball) (1949–2020), American professional baseball executive
Mark Newman (educator) (1772–1859), American educator, deacon, and publisher
Mark Newman (sculptor), American

See also
Mark Neuman (born 1959), American politician in Alaska
Mark Neumann (born 1954), American politician in Wisconsin